The 2008 ATS F3 Cup was the sixth edition of the German F3 Cup. It commenced on 24 May 2008 and ended on 12 October after eighteen rounds. The title was won by Frédéric Vervisch.

Teams and drivers

 Guest drivers in italics.